Ab Nik (also Romanized as Āb Nīḵ) is a village in Hati Rural District, Hati District, Lali County, Khuzestan Province, Iran. At the 2006 census, its population was 96, in 16 families.

References 

Populated places in Lali County